The List of Stolpersteine in St. Ingbert includes all 41 Stolpersteine, that have been laid in Sankt Ingbert, Germany as part of the art project by Gunter Demnig of the same name. They are meant to commemorate the victims of Nazism who lived and worked in the city.

History 
The first 8 Stolpersteine were laid on August 19, 2014. On April 20, 2015, 11 more stones followed. On June 25, 2016, 16 more Stolpersteine were put in place. On October 29, 2018, six more Stolpersteine were installed.

List of Stolpersteine

References 

Sankt Ingbert